Judicial Consent is a 1994 American thriller film written and directed by William Bindley and starring Bonnie Bedelia, Billy Wirth, Lisa Blount, Will Patton and Dabney Coleman.

Cast
Bonnie Bedelia as Gwen Warwick
Will Patton as Alan Warwick
Dabney Coleman as Charles Mayron
Billy Wirth as Martin
Lisa Blount as District Attorney

Release
The film was released on October 21, 1994 at the Hamptons International Film Festival.

Reception
Caren Weiner Campbell of Entertainment Weekly graded the film a B.

References

External links
 
 

1990s English-language films
Films directed by William Bindley